Tournaments include international (FIBA), professional (club) and amateur and collegiate levels.

Events

Tournaments

Men's tournaments

Other tournaments
All-Africa Games at
Pan American Games at
Southeast Asian Games at
Southeast Asia Basketball Association Championship 2009 at

Women's tournaments

Olympic qualifiers
FIBA Africa Championship for Women 2009 at
FIBA Americas Championship for Women 2009 at
FIBA Asia Championship for Women 2009 at
EuroBasket Women 2009 at
FIBA Oceania Championship for Women 2009 at

Other tournaments
Pan American Games at
Southeast Asian Games at
Southeast Asia Basketball Association Championship for Women 2009 at

Youth tournaments
FIBA Under-19 World Championship in Auckland, New Zealand
      
 All-tournament team:
 Mario Delaš
 Gordon Hayward
 Nikolaos Pappas
 Tyshawn Taylor
 Toni Prostran
FIBA Under-19 World Championship for Women in Thailand
FIBA Under-21 World Championship for Women at

Club championships

Intercontinental championships
Euroleague:  Panathinaikos
Eurocup:  Lietuvos Rytas
EuroChallenge:  Virtus Bologna
Asia Champions Cup:  Mahram Tehran
Liga Sudamericana:  Flamengo

National championships
Men:
 NBA
Season:
 Division champions: Boston Celtics (Atlantic), Cleveland Cavaliers (Central), Orlando Magic (Southeast), Denver Nuggets (Northwest), Los Angeles Lakers (Pacific), San Antonio Spurs (Southwest)
 Best regular-season record: Cleveland Cavaliers (66–16)
 Eastern Conference: Orlando Magic
 Western Conference: Los Angeles Lakers
 Finals: The Lakers defeat the Magic 4–1, giving Phil Jackson a record 10th NBA title as a head coach. The Lakers' Kobe Bryant is named Finals MVP.
 Liga Nacional de Básquet, 2008–09 season:
 Regular season: Atenas
 Playoffs: Atenas defeat Peñarol 4–2 in the best-of-seven final.
 National Basketball League, 2008–09 season:
 Premiers: South Dragons
 Champions: South Dragons defeat Melbourne Tigers 3–2 in the best-of-five Grand Final.
 Basketball League Belgium: Spirou Charleroi defeat Dexia Mons-Hainaut 3–0 in the best-of-five final.
 Chinese Basketball Association, 2008–09 season: Guangdong Southern Tigers defeat the Xinjiang Flying Tigers 4–1 in the best-of-seven final.
 Croatian League: Cibona defeat Zadar 3–1 in the best-of-five final.
 Czech League: ČEZ Nymburk defeat Geofin Nový Jičín 4–0 in the best-of-seven final.
 Dutch Eredivisie: MyGuide Amsterdam defeat EiffelTowers Den Bosch 4–3 in the best-of-seven final.
 Estonian League, 2008–09: Kalev/Cramo defeat TÜ/Rock 4–2 in the best-of-7 final.
 French Pro A League: ASVEL Basket defeat Orléans 55–41 in the one-off final.
 German Bundesliga: EWE Baskets Oldenburg defeat Telekom Baskets Bonn 3–2 in the best-of-five final.
 Greek League, 2008–09 season: Panathinaikos defeat Olympiacos 3–1 in the best-of-five final. 
 Iranian Super League, 2008–09 season: Mahram defeat Zob Ahan 2–0 in the best-of-three final.
 Israeli Super League, 2008–09 season: Maccabi Tel Aviv defeat Maccabi Haifa 85–72 in the one-off final.
 Italian Serie A, 2008–09 season: Montepaschi Siena defeat Armani Jeans Milano 4–0 in the best-of-seven final. Montepaschi complete a treble of trophies, having also won the Italian Supercup and Italian Cup; they lost only one out of 44 matches across all domestic competitions this season.
 Lithuanian LKL: Lietuvos Rytas Vilnius defeat Žalgiris Kaunas 4–1 in the best-of-seven final.
 Montenegro League: Budućnost Podgorica defeat Primorje 3–0 in the best-of-five final.
 Philippine Basketball Association, 2008–09 season:
Philippine Cup: The Talk 'N Text Tropang Texters defeat the Alaska Aces 4–3 in the best-of-seven final.
Fiesta Conference:  The San Miguel Beermen defeat the Barangay Ginebra Kings 4–3 in the best-of-seven final.
 Polish League: Asseco Prokom Sopot defeat Turów Zgorzelec 4–1 in the best-of-seven final.
 Russian Super League: CSKA Moscow defeat Khimki Moscow Region 3–1 in the best-of-five final.
 Serbia Super League: Partizan Belgrade defeat Red Star Belgrade 3–2 in the best-of-five final.
 Slovenian League: Union Olimpija defeat Helios Domžale 3–0 in the best-of-five final.
 Spanish ACB:
Season: TAU Cerámica
Playoffs: Regal FC Barcelona defeat TAU Cerámica 3–1 in the best-of-five final.
 Turkish Basketball League: Efes Pilsen defeat Fenerbahçe Ülker 4–2 in the best-of-seven final.
 Ukrainian Super League: Azovmash Mariupol defeat BC Donetsk 3–0 in the best-of-five final.
 British Basketball League, 2008–09:
Season: Newcastle Eagles
Playoffs: Newcastle Eagles defeat Everton Tigers 87–84 in the one-off final.
 Adriatic League: Partizan Belgrade  defeat Cibona Zagreb  63–49 in the one-off final.
 Baltic League: Lietuvos Rytas Vilnius  defeat Žalgiris Kaunas  97–74 in the one-off final.

Women:
 WNBA
Season:
 Eastern Conference: Indiana Fever
 Western Conference and best regular-season record: Phoenix Mercury
 Finals: The Mercury defeat the Fever 3–2 for their second title in three years. The Mercury's Diana Taurasi is named Finals MVP.
2008–09 EuroLeague Women: Spartak Moscow

College
Men:

Women:
 NCAA
Division I: Connecticut 76, Louisville 54
Most Outstanding Player: Tina Charles, UConn
WNIT: South Florida 75, Kansas 71
Division II: Minnesota State-Mankato 103, Franklin Pierce 94
Division III: George Fox 60, Washington (MO) 53
 NAIA
NAIA Division I: Union College (TN) 73, Lambuth University (TN) 63
NAIA Division II: Morningside College (IA) 68, Hastings College (NE) 63
 NJCAA
Division I: Central Arizona College 78, Jefferson College 71
Division II: Kirkwood Community College 62, Schoolcraft College 38
Division III: Rochester Community & Technical College 87, Madison Area Technical College 63
 UAAP Women's: Adamson defeats FEU in the best of three finals 2–0

Prep
 USA Today Boys Basketball Ranking #1:
 USA Today Girls Basketball Ranking #1:
 NCAA (Philippines) Juniors:
 UAAP Juniors: Ateneo defeats DLSZ in the best of three finals 2–1

Awards and honors

Basketball Hall of Fame
Class of 2009:
 Players: Michael Jordan, David Robinson, John Stockton
 Coaches: Jerry Sloan, C. Vivian Stringer

Women's Basketball Hall of Fame
Class of 2009
 Jennifer Azzi
 Cynthia Cooper
 Jennifer Gillom
 Sonja Hogg
 Jill Hutchison
 Ora Washington

FIBA Hall of Fame
Class of 2009
Players
 Jacky Chazalon
 Oscar Robertson
 Ricardo González
 Ubiratan Pereira
Coaches
 Kay Yow
 Pedro Ferrándiz
 Pete Newell
Referees
 Artenik Arabadjian
 Marcel Pfeuti
Contributors
 Al Ramsay

Professional
Men
NBA Most Valuable Player Award: LeBron James, Cleveland Cavaliers
NBA Rookie of the Year Award: Derrick Rose, Chicago Bulls
NBA Defensive Player of the Year Award: Dwight Howard, Orlando Magic
NBA Sixth Man of the Year Award: Jason Terry, Dallas Mavericks
NBA Most Improved Player Award: Danny Granger, Indiana Pacers
NBA Coach of the Year Award: Mike Brown, Cleveland Cavaliers
FIBA Europe Player of the Year Award: Pau Gasol,  and Los Angeles Lakers
Euroscar Award: Pau Gasol,  and Los Angeles Lakers
Mr. Europa: Pau Gasol,  and Los Angeles Lakers
Women
WNBA Most Valuable Player Award: Diana Taurasi, Phoenix Mercury
WNBA Defensive Player of the Year Award: Tamika Catchings, Indiana Fever
WNBA Rookie of the Year Award: Angel McCoughtry, Atlanta Dream
WNBA Sixth Woman of the Year Award: DeWanna Bonner, Phoenix Mercury
WNBA Most Improved Player Award: Crystal Langhorne, Washington Mystics
Kim Perrot Sportsmanship Award: Kara Lawson, Sacramento Monarchs
WNBA Coach of the Year Award: Marynell Meadors, Atlanta Dream
WNBA All-Star Game MVP: Swin Cash, Seattle Storm
WNBA Finals Most Valuable Player Award: Diana Taurasi, Phoenix Mercury
FIBA Europe Player of the Year Award: Sandrine Gruda,  UMMC Ekaterinburg, and Connecticut Sun

Collegiate 
 Combined
Legends of Coaching Award: Rick Barnes, Texas
 Men
John R. Wooden Award: Blake Griffin, Oklahoma
Naismith College Coach of the Year: Jamie Dixon, Pittsburgh
Frances Pomeroy Naismith Award: Darren Collison, UCLA
Associated Press College Basketball Player of the Year: Blake Griffin, Oklahoma
NCAA basketball tournament Most Outstanding Player: Kyle Singler, Duke
USBWA National Freshman of the Year: Tyreke Evans, Memphis
Associated Press College Basketball Coach of the Year: Bill Self, Kansas
Naismith Outstanding Contribution to Basketball: Billy Packer
 Women
John R. Wooden Award: Maya Moore, Connecticut
Naismith College Player of the Year: Maya Moore, Connecticut
Naismith College Coach of the Year: Geno Auriemma, Connecticut
Wade Trophy: Maya Moore, Connecticut
Frances Pomeroy Naismith Award: Renee Montgomery, Connecticut
Associated Press Women's College Basketball Player of the Year: Maya Moore, Connecticut
NCAA basketball tournament Most Outstanding Player: Tina Charles, UConn
Basketball Academic All-America Team: Amber Guffey, Murray State
Carol Eckman Award: Muffet McGraw, Notre Dame
Maggie Dixon Award: Kelly Packard, Ball State
USBWA National Freshman of the Year: Shekinna Stricklen, Tennessee
Associated Press College Basketball Coach of the Year: Geno Auriemma, Connecticut
List of Senior CLASS Award women's basketball winners: Courtney Paris, Oklahoma
Nancy Lieberman Award: Renee Montgomery, Connecticut
Naismith Outstanding Contribution to Basketball: Anne Donovan

Events
 The Italian club Nuova Sebastiani Basket moves from the central Italian city of Rieti to the major southern city of Naples, effective with the 2009–10 season.
 October 20 – The WNBA announces that the Detroit Shock has been purchased by a group of investors from Tulsa, Oklahoma and will move to that city for the 2010 season. In January 2010, the team would be unveiled as the Tulsa Shock.

Movies
Hurricane Season
The Mighty Macs
Streetballers
The Winning Season

Deaths
 January 29 — Kay Yow, Hall of Fame coach of the NC State Lady Wolfpack (born 1942)
 February 5 — Mel Thompson, American college coach (The Citadel) (born 1932)
 February 20 — Larry H. Miller, American businessman, owner of the Utah Jazz (born 1944)
 February 26 — Johnny Kerr, Former NBA player, coach and Chicago Bulls announcer (born 1932)
 February 26 — Norm Van Lier, Former NBA player and announcer (born 1947)
 March 13 — William Davidson, American businessman, owner of the Detroit Pistons and Hall of Famer (born 1923)
 April 4 — Marvin Webster, The "Human Eraser" was a 10-year NBA vet and Division II National Champion at Morgan State University (born 1952)
 April 16 — Reggie Royals, ABA player (San Diego Conquistadors) (born 1950)
 April 27 — Glen Gondrezick, Former NBA and UNLV guard (born 1955)
 April 29 — Alexander Athas, American basketball player and sports celebrity (born 1922)
 April 30 — Hal Perry, Starting guard on San Francisco's back to back national championship teams (1955 & 1956) (born 1933)
 May 9 — Chuck Daly, Two-time NBA Champion coach of the Detroit Pistons and coach of the 1992 US Olympic team (born 1930)
 May 15 — Wayman Tisdale, American player, member of the College Basketball Hall of Fame and 12-year NBA veteran; also a renowned jazz bass guitarist (born 1964)
 May 21 — DeWitt Menyard, American ABA player (Houston Mavericks) (born 1944)
 June 4 — Randy Smith, Former All-Star guard for the Buffalo Braves (born 1948)
 July 27 — Dick Holub, Former Fairleigh Dickinson coach and All-American player at LIU (born 1921)
 August 11 — Kirby Minter, American basketball player, MVP of the 1954 FIBA World Championship (born 1929)
 August 13 — Lavelle Felton, American basketball player (born 1980)
 August 17 — Paul Hogue, All-American and 1962 NCAA Tournament Most Outstanding Player at Cincinnati (born 1940)
 August 19 — Harry Kermode, Canadian Olympic player (1948) (born 1922)
 September 29 — Ebony Dickinson, American basketball player (born 1977)
 October 19 — Joe Hutton, American NBA player (Minneapolis Lakers) (born 1928)
 October 19 — Angelo Musi, NBA (Philadelphia Warriors) and ABL player (born 1918)
 October 23 — Ron Sobieszczyk, former member of the New York Knicks and Minneapolis Lakers (born 1934)
 October 30 — Howie Schultz, member of two NBA championship teams with the Minneapolis Lakers (born 1922)
 November 1 — Jonathan Bourhis, French player (JDA Dijon Basket) (born 1990)
 November 1 — Alan Ogg, former UAB and Miami Heat center (born 1967)
 November 9 — Al Cervi, Hall of Fame player and coach of the 1955 NBA Champion Syracuse Nationals (born 1917)
 November 18 — Red Robbins, Tennessee standout and ABA player (born 1944)
 November 22 — Bob Armstrong, American NBL player (Youngstown Bears) (born 1920)
 November 24 — Abe Pollin, Owner of the Washington Wizards and Washington Mystics (born 1923)
 December 8 — Fred Sheffield, BAA player (Philadelphia Warriors) (born 1923)
 December 28 — Zoltán Horváth, Hungarian player (born 1979)

See also
 Timeline of women's basketball

References

External links